Mohammed Alhassan (born 9 January 1984) is a Ghanaian footballer. He currently plays for Eleven Wise.

Career
Alhassan was the Second choice keeper for Asante Kotoko who caused much consternation when he chose to sign for Asante Kotoko ahead of their great rivals Hearts of Oak. In July 2008 he moved from Asante Kotoko to Kessben F.C. included teammate Michael Ofosu-Appiah, after 6 months left the club from Prempeh and signs a contract by Eleven Wise.

International
He was part of the Ghanaian 2004 Olympic football team, but didn't play in the tournament.

External links
FIFA Profile

References

1984 births
Living people
Ghanaian footballers
Asante Kotoko S.C. players
Olympic footballers of Ghana
Footballers at the 2004 Summer Olympics
Sekondi Wise Fighters players
Medeama SC players
Association football goalkeepers